Dance of the Vampires may refer to:

 Dance of the Vampires, the UK title of the 1967 film The Fearless Vampire Killers
 Dance of the Vampires (musical), a German-language musical based on the 1976 film